A partial lunar eclipse took place on Tuesday, March 13, 1979, the first of two lunar eclipses in 1979. The Moon was strikingly shadowed in this deep partial eclipse which lasted 3 hours, 17 minutes and 40.6 seconds, with 85.377% of the Moon in darkness at maximum.

This event followed the total solar eclipse of February 26, 1979.

Visibility 
It was completely visible in east in North America, South America, Europe, Africa, Asia and west in Australia, seen rising over the Americas and setting over Asia and Australia.

Related lunar eclipses

Eclipses in 1979 
 A total solar eclipse on Monday, 26 February 1979.
 A partial lunar eclipse on Tuesday, 13 March 1979.
 An annular solar eclipse on Wednesday, 22 August 1979.
 A total lunar eclipse on Thursday, 6 September 1979.

Lunar year series

Saros series

Half-Saros cycle
A lunar eclipse will be preceded and followed by solar eclipses by 9 years and 5.5 days (a half saros). This lunar eclipse is related to two total solar eclipses of Solar Saros 139.

See also 
List of lunar eclipses
List of 20th-century lunar eclipses

Notes

External links 
 

1979-03
1979 in science
March 1979 events